Urgel may refer to:

Urgel (Madrid Metro), a station on Line 5
Urgell, a comarca in Catalonia, Spain
Urgell (Barcelona Metro), a station on Line 1